Drangajökull (regionally also ) is the northernmost glacier of Iceland. It is situated southwest of the peninsula Hornstrandir in the Westfjords region. It is the only Icelandic glacier which lies entirely below an altitude of 1000 metres and also the only one that has not shrunk in recent years.

See also
 Fjords of Iceland
 Glaciers of Iceland

Westfjords
Glaciers of Iceland